Ethmia quadripunctella is a moth in the family Depressariidae. It is found in Russia.

References

Moths described in 1844
quadripunctella